Orang Ulu ("people of the interior" in Malay) is an ethnic designation politically coined to group together roughly 27 very small but ethnically diverse tribal groups in northeastern Sarawak, Malaysia with populations ranging from less than 300 persons to over 25,000 persons. Orang Ulu is not a legal term, and no such racial group exists or is listed in the Malaysian Constitution. The term was popularised by the Orang Ulu National Association (OUNA), which was formed in 1969.

The Orang Ulu tribal groups are diverse, they typically live in longhouses elaborately decorated with murals and woodcarvings. They are also well known for their intricate beadwork detailed tattoos, rattan weaving, and other tribal crafts. The Orang Ulu tribes can also be identified by their unique music - distinctive sounds from their sapes, a plucked boat-shaped lute, formerly with two strings, nowadays usually with four strings. They also practice Kanjet, a form of traditional dance.

A vast majority of the Orang Ulu tribes are Christians, but old traditional religions are still practiced in some areas.

Orang Ulu classification
There are about 27 small Dayak people groups that are classified as Orang Ulu such as:-
 Apo Kayan people
 Kenyah people
 Kajang
 Kajaman
 Lahanan
 Sian
 Penan
 Sebop
 Kayan people (Borneo)
 Bahau people
 Kendayan
 Ukit people
 Murut people
 Tagol
 Punan
 Uheng Kereho  
 Hovongan 
 Bukitan people 
 Lisum
 Apo Duat
 Kelabit people
Berawan
 Kiput
 Lun Bawang
 Sa'ban people

Notable people
 Baru Bian

See also
 Sarawak
 Penan
 Apo Kayan

References

External links
 Orang Ulu at Visiting Longhouses
 Orang Ulu at Virtual Malaysia
 Punan Community website

Indigenous peoples of Southeast Asia
Dayak people